The Susan Strange Award, named after the renowned Susan Strange, was established in 1998 to reward innovative thinkers in the field of international studies.

Susan Strange

Recipients 

 Rudolph Rummel (1999) - the first recipient of the Susan Strange Award
 Steve Smith (2000)
 Robert W. Cox (2001)
 Steve Brams (2002)
 J. David Singer (2003)
 Ken Booth (2004)
 Frank C. Zagare (2005)
 George Modelski (2006)
 Cynthia Enloe (2007)
 Hayward Alker (2008)
 John Mueller (2009)
 Richard Falk (2010)
 Peter J. Katzenstein (2011)
 Robert O. Keohane (2012)
 Kathryn Sikkink (2013)
 Dina Zinnes (2014)
 Andrew Hurrell (2015)
 Bruce Bueno de Mesquita (2016)
 Scott Sagan (2017)
 J. Ann Tickner (2018)
 Jonathan Wilkenfeld (2019)

See also 
 International Studies Association

Citations 

Political science awards